Toby Albertine Maurits Alderweireld (born 2 March 1989) is a Belgian professional footballer who plays as a centre-back or right-back for Belgian Pro League club Royal Antwerp.

Alderweireld began his professional career at Dutch club Ajax, where he won honours including three consecutive Eredivisie titles. In 2013, he moved to Atlético Madrid, where he won La Liga and reached the UEFA Champions League final in his first season. After a year on loan at Southampton, he moved to Tottenham Hotspur in 2015 and once again reached the Champions League final in 2019. He left Tottenham in 2021, having made 236 official appearances, to join Al-Duhail. After one season in Qatar, he returned to Belgium and signed for his hometown club Royal Antwerp.

A senior Belgium international from 2009 to 2022, Alderweireld earned 127 caps and represented the country at the FIFA World Cup in 2014, 2018 and 2022, and the UEFA European Championship in 2016 and 2020.

Club career

Ajax
Born in Antwerp, Alderweireld moved to Ajax's youth academy in August 2004 from Germinal Beerschot. On 22 February 2007, he signed his first professional contract, tying him to the club until 30 June 2010. He was promoted to the first team for the 2008–09 season, but only made his first team debut on 18 January, in the 4–2 victory over NEC. On 26 February, he made his European debut during a 1–1 draw against Fiorentina in the UEFA Cup. Although he only made several appearances for the remainder of the season, he was awarded a new long-term contract extension until 2014.

During the early stages of the 2009–10 season, Alderweireld established himself in the first team and starting XI. He became first-choice centre back along with fellow Belgian Jan Vertonghen following the departure of former captain Thomas Vermaelen to Arsenal. New Ajax coach Martin Jol praised the two defenders and kept faith in the duo after a string of good performances. During the 3–0 win against Heracles on 4 September, he scored his first league goal for the club when he opened the scoring with a header from Luis Suárez's corner-kick. On 27 January, he scored a late equaliser in extra time during the KNVB Cup quarter-final against NEC; Siem de Jong scored five minutes before the final whistle to steal a 3–2 win for Ajax. At the end of the 2009–10 season, Alderweireld was named Ajax Talent of the Year. He assured himself of a place in the Eredivisie giants' history books on 3 November 2011, heading in Ajax's 100th UEFA Champions League goal in the 2–1 Group G defeat by Auxerre. In the 2010–11 season, he scored a stunning 25-yard strike at the San Siro against Champions League group rivals Milan in a 2–0 away win. He followed this spectacular goal with an even more impressive 32-yard strike against Feyenoord in a 2–0 home win.
In the 2011–12 season, Alderweireld made significant strides in his ability as a footballer, also forming a formidable partnership in the heart of the Ajax defensive with captain and fellow Belgian Jan Vertonghen. Alderweireld also showed some impressive offensive ability, scoring a remarkable goal against Heerenveen.

On 5 August 2012, during the Johan Cruyff Shield encounter against PSV, Alderweireld managed to score for Ajax in the 44th minute, bringing his club back within a goals difference going into halftime 2–1. It was a match Ajax would lose 4–2, making it the third Johan Cruyff Shield which Alderweireld participated in and finished as runners-up. The following 2012–13 season, however, would be a successful one, marking the third year in a row that Alderweireld would play Champions League football, and also winning his third consecutive Eredivisie title for Ajax and 32nd overall, having played as a starting centre back for Ajax in all three championship pursuits. Alderweireld scored a further three goals that season for Ajax, including two goals during the regular season against PEC Zwolle and Twente, as well as scoring another goal in a 2–0 home victory against Steaua București at the Amsterdam Arena, in the first leg of the Round of 32 in the 2012–13 UEFA Europa League. Having been drawn into a group with Manchester City, Real Madrid and eventual runners-up Borussia Dortmund during its Champions League campaign, Ajax had entered into the Europa League at the knockout phase having secured third place in their group, but failed to advance, losing in the second leg match in Romania 4–2 on penalty kicks after extra time.

With one more year remaining on his contract, Alderweireld opted not to extend his contract with Ajax, subsequently receiving plenty of interest during the off-season, with Bayer Leverkusen, Liverpool, Napoli and Norwich City being mentioned as the most keen to sign the young defender.

Atlético Madrid
On 2 September 2013, Alderweireld joined Atlético Madrid on a four-year contract for an estimated €7 million (£6.16 million) transfer fee. He played 12 matches as the club won La Liga; on 11 May, he headed his only goal of the season, an equaliser in a 1–1 home draw with Málaga in the penultimate round of fixtures, ensuring that Atlético remained in the title race. Alderweireld played the final seven minutes and extra time of the 2014 Champions League final for Atlético in place of Filipe Luís; the team was beating city rival Real Madrid 1–0 when he entered the field of play, but Atlético eventually lost 1–4.

Southampton (loan)
Alderweireld was sent on a season-long loan to English Premier League side Southampton on 1 September 2014, with the option for Southampton to buy him at the end of the season. He made his Southampton debut on 13 September, helping to keep a clean sheet in a 4–0 victory against Newcastle United. On 26 December, he scored his first goal for the club, Southampton's third in a 3–1 away win away to Crystal Palace by heading James Ward-Prowse's corner kick.

Southampton had a £6.8 million option to buy Alderweireld, but in July 2015 Atlético cancelled the clause for £1.5 million in order to sell to the highest bidder. Subsequent reports claimed that Atlético failed to exercise their buy-out in time.

Tottenham Hotspur
On 8 July 2015, Alderweireld joined Tottenham Hotspur on a five-year contract which ran until the summer of 2020 at White Hart Lane, despite Southampton threatening legal action over the transfer. At Spurs, he was reunited with former Ajax teammates Christian Eriksen and Jan Vertonghen, who previously joined the north London side from Ajax.  On 30 July, Alderweireld made his club debut in the 2015 MLS All-Star Game in Denver, Colorado.

2015–16: First season with Spurs
On 26 September, Alderweireld scored his first goal for Tottenham in a 4–1 win over Manchester City at White Hart Lane. His second goal for the club came in another 4–1 victory over London rivals West Ham United on 22 November. On 5 March 2016, in the 183rd North London Derby, Alderweireld scored for Tottenham in a 2–2 draw against Arsenal. A month later, he was Spurs' second scorer in a 3–0 win against Manchester United.

During his first season at Tottenham, Alderweireld has been recognised by commentators as one of the best defenders in the Premier League, forming impressive central defensive partnerships with national team colleague Jan Vertonghen and later the Austrian Kevin Wimmer. This form helped Tottenham to achieve the best defensive record in the Premier League, with only 25 goals conceded from 34 games. Over the season the club had the joint-lowest number of goals conceded (35) in the Premier League. He was chosen as a centre back for the PFA Team of the Year.

2016–2021
In the 2016–17 season, he was a regular in the Spurs starting line-up until an injury sustained at West Bromwich Albion on 15 October. This injury kept him on the injury list for several weeks, until he made his return in the Champions League as a substitute against CSKA Moscow on 7 December. Alderweireld picked up the final goal of the season for Tottenham, coming in the 7–1 win over already-relegated Hull City on 21 May 2017. He was part of the Tottenham defense that achieved the best defensive record in the club's history, with only 26 goals conceded in the Premier League this season (only 9 of which were conceded in home league games), 6 better than the previous record of 32 conceded that was set in the 1908–09 season in the Second Division.

Alderweireld played in all the Premier League and Champions League games from the start of the 2017–18 season, but on 1 November 2017, he suffered a hamstring injury in the home game against Real Madrid that ended in a 3–1 win. The injury would keep him out of the team for a few months. On 7 February 2018, he returned to the starting lineup in the fourth round replay of the FA Cup against Newport County, which Tottenham won 2–0. However, an injury to the tendon of his hamstring suffered while training two weeks later meant that he was again out of the team. He returned to the squad in April towards the end of the season.

After a season curtailed by injuries and being out of favour, Alderweireld again became a regular player for Tottenham in the 2018–19 season.  In January 2019, Tottenham took up an option to extend his contract until 2020. He scored an own goal in the last minute in the tightly fought game against Liverpool, losing 2–1.

On 20 December 2019, Alderweireld signed a contract extension to 2023. On 16 February 2020, Alderweireld scored his first goal for the club since May 2017, making amends for an earlier own goal, and helped Tottenham win 3–2 away to Aston Villa. On 12 July 2020, he scored an 81st-minute winner against Arsenal in a North London derby to help his team to a 2–1 victory.

On 2 January 2021, Alderweireld scored his first goal of the 2020–21 season in a 3–0 home win against Leeds United.

Al-Duhail
On 27 July 2021, Tottenham Hotspur announced that Alderweireld would join Qatar Stars League club Al-Duhail. He made 29 appearances for the side during the 2021–22 season, scoring once in the quarter-final match of their Emir of Qatar Cup-winning campaign, a 4–1 win over Al-Sailiya on 6 March 2022.

Royal Antwerp
On 15 July 2022, Alderweireld joined Belgian First Division A club Royal Antwerp on a three-year deal.

International career

Alderweireld first represented Belgium at under-17 level in October 2005 and took part in the 2006 UEFA U17 Championship. After the 2008–09 season concluded, he made his senior debut for Belgium in a friendly tournament, Kirin Cup, against Chile on 29 May 2009. However, his full senior debut came three months later in a match against the Czech Republic. He was named in several 2010 World Cup qualifying squads, but was mostly an unused substitute. In October 2009, he came on as a second-half substitute for Daniel Van Buyten in the 2–0 defeat to Estonia.

Alderweireld was called up to the Belgian U21 squad for the 2011 UEFA U21 Championship qualifier against Ukraine on 13 November 2009, with the match finishing 2–0 to Ukraine. He played right back during the 2012 UEFA Euro qualification match against Turkey on 7 September 2010.

On 13 May 2014, Alderweireld was named in the squad to go to the 2014 FIFA World Cup. He started in all five games of Belgium's tournament run, including its 1–0 defeat against Argentina in the quarter-finals. In the 2018 FIFA World Cup, he won a bronze medal with Belgium after a 2–0 win over England. On 8 September 2020, Alderweireld played his 100th match for Belgium in a 5–1 win against Iceland.

On 6 March 2023, he announced his retirement from international football.

Personal life
Alderweireld married Shani Van Mieghem in Ekeren, Antwerp on 19 June 2015. They had their first child Ayla born in September 2018. His son Jace was born in February 2020.

Career statistics

Club

International

Belgium score listed first, score column indicates score after each Alderweireld goal.

Honours
Ajax
Eredivisie: 2010–11, 2011–12, 2012–13
KNVB Cup: 2009–10
Johan Cruyff Shield: 2013

Atlético Madrid
La Liga: 2013–14
UEFA Champions League runner-up: 2013–14

Tottenham Hotspur
UEFA Champions League runner-up: 2018–19
EFL Cup runner-up: 2020–21

Al-Duhail
Emir of Qatar Cup: 2022

Belgium
FIFA World Cup third place: 2018

Individual
Ajax Talent of the Year: 2010
AFC Ajax Club of 100: 2013
PFA Team of the Year: 2015–16 Premier League
UEFA Europa League Squad of the Season: 2015–16
Tottenham Hotspur Player of the Year: 2015–16

See also 
 List of men's footballers with 100 or more international caps

References

External links

Toby Alderweireld profile on the Official Tottenham Hotspur Website

1989 births
Living people
Footballers from Antwerp
Belgian footballers
Belgium youth international footballers
Belgium under-21 international footballers
Belgium international footballers
Association football defenders
Beerschot A.C. players
AFC Ajax players
Atlético Madrid footballers
Southampton F.C. players
Tottenham Hotspur F.C. players
Al-Duhail SC players
Royal Antwerp F.C. players
Eredivisie players
La Liga players
Premier League players
Qatar Stars League players
Belgian Pro League players
2014 FIFA World Cup players
UEFA Euro 2016 players
2018 FIFA World Cup players
UEFA Euro 2020 players
2022 FIFA World Cup players
FIFA Century Club
Belgian expatriate footballers
Expatriate footballers in the Netherlands
Expatriate footballers in Spain
Expatriate footballers in England
Expatriate footballers in Qatar
Belgian expatriate sportspeople in the Netherlands
Belgian expatriate sportspeople in Spain
Belgian expatriate sportspeople in England
Belgian expatriate sportspeople in Qatar
Flemish sportspeople